Signal is an unincorporated community in Columbiana County, Ohio, United States. It is home to the Columbiana County Port Authority Signal rail terminal.

History
A post office called Signal was established in 1890, and remained in operation until 1959. The origin of the name "Signal" is obscure.

References

Unincorporated communities in Columbiana County, Ohio
Unincorporated communities in Ohio